Fatehpur Assembly constituency is one of constituencies of Rajasthan Legislative Assembly in the Sikar (Lok Sabha constituency). Current MLA of Fatehpur constituency is Hakam Ali Khan of INC who won against Sunita Kumari of BJP by 853 votes in 2018 assembly election. Hakam Ali Khan is younger brother of former three time MLA Bhanwaru Khan.

Fatehpur Constituency covers all voters from Fathehpur tehsil.

See also 
 Member of the Legislative Assembly (India)

References

Sikar district
Assembly constituencies of Rajasthan